is a city located in Chiba Prefecture, Japan. , the city had an estimated population of  74,469 in 31,113 households and a population density of 280 persons per km2. Katori Shrine is in the city of Katori, as is the old merchant town and canal of Sawara.

Geography
Katori is located in far northeastern Chiba Prefecture, along the lower reaches of the Tone River. It is about 45 kilometers from the prefectural capital at Chiba and 70 to 80 kilometers from central Tokyo. It is included in the Narita metropolitan area (Narita city) in the urban employment area, and the commuting rate to Narita city is 12.7% (2010 census). It borders Ibaraki prefecture on the opposite bank across the Tone River. The city is in the Kanto Plain, and although there are places along the Tone River that exceed 50 meters, the average elevation of the city is approximately 20 to 40 meters. Parts of the city are located within the borders of the Suigō-Tsukuba Quasi-National Park.

Surrounding municipalities
Chiba Prefecture
Narita
Sōsa
Asahi
Kōzaki
Tako
Tōnoshō
Ibaraki Prefecture
Inashiki, Ibaraki
Itako
Kamisu

Climate
Katori has a humid subtropical climate (Köppen Cfa) characterized by warm summers and cool winters with light to no snowfall.

Demographics
Per Japanese census data, the population of Katori has declined over the past 30 years.

History
After the Meiji Restoration, the area consisted of the towns of Sawara and Omigawa, and the villages of Katori, Kanishi and Higashi-Daito (founded within Katori District on May 23, 1890). Katori was raised to town status on May 5, 1897. On March 15, 1951, the city of Sawara was formed by the merger of Katori, Sawara, Omigawa and Higashi-Daito. Sawara expanded on February 11, 1955, by annexing the neighboring villages of Niijima, Okura, Mizuho and Tsunomiya.

On March 27, 2006, the modern city of Katori was created when Sawara was merged with the towns of Kurimoto, Omigawa and Yamada (all from Katori District).

Government
Katori has a mayor-council form of government with a directly elected mayor and a unicameral city council of 22 members. Katori, together with the neighboring towns of Kōzaki and Tako, contributes two members to the Chiba Prefectural Assembly. In terms of national politics, the city is part of Chiba 10th district of the lower house of the Diet of Japan.

Economy
Katori is a regional commercial center. The economy is primarily agricultural, with rice, chives, onions, and greater burdock as major crops.

Education
Katori has 16 public elementary schools and seven public middle schools operated by the city government, and three public high schools operated by the Chiba Prefectural Board of Education. There is also one private high school.

Transportation

Railways
 JR East –  Narita Line
  -  -  -  - 
 JR East –  Kashima Line
(Sawara -) Katori - Jūnikyō

Highways

Local attractions
 Kanpuku-ji
 Yamakurayama Kanpuku-ji
 Katori Jingu
 Kurobe River
 Suigō Sawara Aquatic Botanical Garden

Noted people from Katori
Takao Sakurai, professional boxer
Kazuo Misaki, mixed martial artist
Kento Masuda, composer and recording artist
 Yamamura Shinjiro, Minister of Transport, involved in Japan Airlines Flight 351 hijacking

References

External links

Official Website 

 
Cities in Chiba Prefecture
2006 establishments in Japan
Populated places established in 2006